In enzymology, a cholesterol oxidase is an enzyme that catalyzes the chemical reaction

cholesterol + O2  cholest-4-en-3-one + H2O2

Thus, the two substrates of this enzyme are cholesterol and O2, whereas its two products are cholest-4-en-3-one and H2O2.

This enzyme belongs to the family of oxidoreductases, specifically those acting on the CH-OH group of donor with oxygen as acceptor.  The systematic name of this enzyme class is cholesterol:oxygen oxidoreductase. Other names in common use include cholesterol- O2 oxidoreductase, 3beta-hydroxy steroid oxidoreductase, and 3beta-hydroxysteroid:oxygen oxidoreductase.  This enzyme participates in bile acid biosynthesis.

The substrate-binding domain found in some bacterial cholesterol oxidases is composed of an eight-stranded mixed beta-pleated sheet and six alpha-helices. This domain is positioned over the isoalloxazine ring system of the FAD cofactor bound by the FAD-binding domain and forms the roof of the active site cavity, allowing for catalysis of oxidation and isomerisation of cholesterol to cholest-4-en-3-one.

Structural studies

References

Further reading

 
 

Protein domains
EC 1.1.3
Enzymes of known structure